Abgurandan (also Romanized as Ābgūrāndān; also known as Āb Charīān and Lāgū-ye Charīān) is a village in Abtar Rural District, in the Central District of Iranshahr County, Sistan and Baluchestan Province, Iran. At the 2006 census, its population was 277, in 63 families.

References 

Populated places in Iranshahr County